The Willamette Valley ponderosa pine is a population of the ponderosa pine (Pinus ponderosa) native to the Willamette Valley in Oregon.  It is adapted for Western Oregon's wet winter and dry summer.

History
The Willamette Valley ponderosa variant only grows on the valley floor, unlike the Douglas-fir, which grows on hillsides, and the wood is softer and easier to mill than the native hardwoods. Because of this, when early settlers used wood from the trees to build homes and cleared land for agriculture, the population was "decimated". Prior to restoration efforts, the pine survived only in scattered stands between Hillsboro and Cottage Grove. The Lewis's woodpecker and the slender-billed nuthatch (a subspecies of the white-breasted nuthatch) nest in the tree and rely on it for food–their populations were reduced along with that of the pine.

References

External links
The Nature of Cedar Mill: Willamette Valley Ponderosa Pine
 
Bark Beetles and Willamette Valley Ponderosa Pine: Populations, Geographical Distribution and Management Recommendations

Pinus
Trees of the Northwestern United States
Willamette Valley